Éric Janvier (born 26 January 1962) is a French  businessman.

Biography
A graduate of the École Polytechnique and MBA HEC, Janvier was the co-founder of Schlumberger Business Consulting (SBC)  and led the company's Capital Projects Practice. He was previously in charge of SBC business for Europe, the Confederation of Independent States and Africa.

Previously Janvier was a vice-president at Cambridge Technology Partners and from 1989 to 1999 was a partner at McKinsey & Company .

References

External links
Interview with Eric Janvier in Journal du Net  
 Executive Biographies Schlumberger Business Consulting

1962 births
Living people
École Polytechnique alumni
HEC Paris alumni
French engineers
McKinsey & Company people
People from Indre
French businesspeople
French corporate directors